Philotas was the son of Parmenion executed by Alexander the Great.

Philotas may also refer to:

Philotas (father of Parmenion), and grandfather of the famous Philotas
Philotas (musician), a dithyrambic poet and musician 5th century BC
Philotas (phrourarch), of Cadmea and Tyre general of Alexander the Great
Philotas (satrap), a general of Alexander and Perdiccas
Philotas (son of Carsis), royal page of Alexander
Philotas (Antigonid general), late 4th century BC
Philotas (Antiochid general), 2nd century BC
Philotas (physician), from Amphissa 1st century BC
Philotas of Thebes, Boeotian mythological figure